Adolf Fehr may refer to:

 Adolf Fehr (field hockey) (born 1904), Swiss field hockey player
 Adolf Fehr (alpine skier) (born 1940), Liechtenstein former alpine skier